John or Jack Kelly may refer to:

People

Academics and scientists
John Kelly (engineer), Irish professor, former Registrar of University College Dublin
John Kelly (scholar) (1750–1809), at Douglas, Isle of Man
John Forrest Kelly (1859–1922), scientist
John Larry Kelly Jr. (1923–1965), scientist at Bell Labs
John F. Kelly (professor), professor of addiction medicine
John Norman Davidson Kelly, British theologian and academic

Arts and entertainment
Jack Kelly (actor) (1927–1992), American film and TV actor, in U.S. TV series Maverick
John Kelly (actor) (1901–1947), American film actor whose credits include Meet Dr. Christian
John Kelly (artist) (born 1965), Australian artist
John Kelly (author) (born 1964), British author and illustrator
John Kelly (born 1978), member of the Doctor Who Restoration Team
John Kelly (Irish broadcaster) (born 1965), Irish radio broadcaster and presenter of The View
John Liddell Kelly (1850–1925), British journalist and poet
John Melville Kelly (1879–1962), American/Hawaiian artist
John Kelly (performance artist) (born 1959), American performance artist, visual artist and writer
Johnny Kelly (born 1968), American drummer

Politicians

United Kingdom
John Kelly (Sinn Féin politician) (1936–2007), Northern Irish republican leader
John Richards Kelly (1844–1922), British Member of Parliament for Camberwell North, 1886–1892
Basil Kelly (John William Basil Kelly, 1920–2008), Northern Irish Unionist politician

United States
Jack Kelly (politician) (born c. 1939), former Philadelphia Republican councilman-at-large
John Kelly (New York politician) (1822–1886), politician in Tammany Hall, U.S. Representative from New York (1855–1858)
John B. Kelly (Boston politician) (died 1969), Boston City councilor
John David Kelly (1934–1998), American judge
John F. Kelly (born 1950), former White House Chief of Staff, United States Marine Corps general, and Secretary of Homeland Security
John F. Kelly (Michigan politician) (1949–2018), Judge Advocate General and State Senator for Michigan
John R. Kelly (born 1946), Republican member of the West Virginia House of Delegates
John V. Kelly (1926–2009), American Republican Party politician in New Jersey
John Kelly (Brooklyn politician) (1855–1900), American politician from New York

Other countries
John Kelly (bailiff) (c. 1793–1854), Member of the House of Keys and High Bailiff of Castletown, Isle of Man
John Kelly (Canadian politician) (1852–1934), municipal councillor in Edmonton, Alberta, Canada
John Kelly (New South Wales politician) (1840–1896), Australian politician
John Kelly (Roscommon politician) (born 1960), Irish Labour Party Senator
John M. Kelly (politician) (1931–1991), Irish Fine Gael politician, cabinet member, legal scholar, and novelist 
John Robert Kelly (1849–1919), farmer and politician in colonial South Australia

Military personnel
John Kelly of Killanne (died 1798), leader of the Irish Rebellion of 1798 in Wexford
Jack Sherwood Kelly (1880–1931), adventurer and soldier awarded the Victoria Cross
John Kelly (Royal Navy officer) (1871–1936), British Admiral of the Fleet
John D. Kelly (Korean War soldier) (1928–1952), USMC, Korean War Medal of Honor recipient
John D. Kelly (World War II soldier) (1923–1944), American soldier, World War II Medal of Honor recipient
John F. Kelly (born 1950), White House Chief of Staff, United States Marine Corps general, and Secretary of Homeland Security
John H. Kelly (1840–1864), Confederate brigadier general
John J. Kelly (1898–1957), USMC, World War I, Army Medal of Honor and Navy Medal of Honor recipient

Sportspeople

Association football
Jack Kelly (English footballer) (1913–2000), English footballer with clubs including Burnley and Leeds United
John Kelly (footballer, born 1909) (1909–?), English footballer for York City
John Kelly (footballer, born 1913) (1913–?), English footballer for Bradford City
John Kelly (footballer, born 1921) (1921–2001), Scottish international football player (Barnsley)
John Kelly (footballer, born 1935), Scottish footballer for Crewe Alexandra
John Kelly (footballer, born 1960), Anglo-Irish soccer player whose clubs included Tranmere Rovers, Preston
John Paul Kelly (football) (born 1987), Irish footballer

American football
John Kelly (offensive lineman) (born 1944), American football player
John Kelly (running back) (born 1996), American football running back
Shipwreck Kelly (American football) (John Simms Kelly, 1910–1986), American football player

Rugby football
John Kelly (rugby, born 1917), English former rugby union and professional rugby league footballer
John Kelly (rugby union, born 1974), Irish rugby union player
Jack Kelly (rugby union, born 1926) (1926–2002), New Zealand rugby union player
Jack Kelly (rugby union, born 1997), Irish rugby union player

Other sports
Kick Kelly (John O. Kelly, 1856–1926), American baseball player and umpire, boxing referee and gambling operator
Jack Kelly (Australian footballer) (1916–1971), Australian rules footballer for St Kilda
John Kelly (boxer) (1932–2016), Northern Irish boxer
John Kelly (catcher) (1859–1908), 1879–1884 baseball player
John Kelly (equestrian) (born 1930), Australian Olympic equestrian
John Kelly (golfer) (born 1984), American amateur golfer
John Kelly (Lancashire and Derbyshire cricketer) (1922–1979), English cricketer
John Kelly (Nottinghamshire cricketer) (1930–2008), English cricketer
John Kelly (outfielder) (1879–1944), 1907 baseball player
John Kelly (racewalker) (1929–2012), Irish Olympic athlete
John Kelly (sportscaster) (born 1960), ice hockey sportscaster
John Kelly (Tipperary hurler) (born 1948), Irish retired sportsperson
Jack Kelly Jr. (rower) (1927–1985), John B. Kelly Jr., an Olympic rower, Philadelphia councilman, head of the US Olympic Committee and brother of Grace Kelly
Jack Kelly Sr. (rower) (1889–1960), John B. Kelly Jr. (nicknamed "Jack"), Olympic rower, father of actress, Grace Kelly and John B. Kelly Jr.
Jack Kelly (hurler) (born 1996), Irish hurler
John Kelly (runner) (born 1984), American endurance athlete
John-Paul Kelly (ice hockey) (born 1959), Canadian ice hockey player

Other people
John Kelly (1840–1904), British architect specialising in churches, see Kelly & Birchall
John Kelly (diplomat) (born 1941), British diplomat and governor of the Turks and Caicos Islands
John Kelly (minister) (1801–1876), Congregational minister
John A. Kelly (1943–1978), American investigative journalist in Boston, Massachusetts
John E. Kelly III, American executive at IBM
John Gregory Kelly (born 1956), American Roman Catholic bishop
John Hall Kelly (1879–1941), former Canadian High Commissioner to Ireland
John Hubert Kelly (1939–2011), U.S. diplomat
John P. Kelly (clergyman), convening apostle of the International Coalition of Apostolic Leaders

Characters
Jack Kelly, character in the 1992 Disney film Newsies, played by Christian Bale, and the Disney stage musical Newsies where the role was originated by Jeremy Jordan 
Jack Kelly, lawyer uncle in It's Always Sunny in Philadelphia with concerns about the size of his hands
John Clark (Ryanverse character), character in a number of Tom Clancy novels
John Kelly (NYPD Blue), character on the TV series NYPD Blue, played by David Caruso
John Kelly, character on the TV series Brooklyn Nine-Nine, played by Phil Reeves

Other
John Kelly Girls' Technology College
John P. Kelly (album), a 2001 album by rapper Mr. Cheeks

See also
Jon Kelly (disambiguation)
John Kelley (disambiguation)
John Paul Kelly (disambiguation)